Robert Plagnol is a French actor, who starred as Boris Vildé in the French TV series Résistance.

Plagnol has appeared in numerous films, TV shows and plays.

Filmography 
 2013 : Joséphine, ange gardien (TV Series / 1 Episode) : Alex
 2015 : Call My Agent ! (TV Series / 1 Episode) : Clément
 2017 : The Frozen Dead (TV series / 6 episodes): Eric Lombard

References

External links
 

Living people
21st-century French male actors
French male film actors
French male television actors
French male stage actors
Year of birth missing (living people)